is a Japanese visual novel developed by Navel and its sister company, Lime. The game, made for Windows, was adult-only and was released on August 31, 2007. The "Pon"'s in the title refer to the term pong in the strategy game mahjong. This is due to an element in the gameplay of Nee Pon? × Rai Pon! where the player gets to play mahjong against the computer. The mahjong tiles in the game contain images of the characters from Shuffle! and Soul Link, two previous titles by Navel.

Plot
When a teenage boy named Masato suddenly wakes up, he finds himself in a strange world. He does not remember anything from his past except for his name. When he is at a loss what to do, a young girl suddenly appears in front of him. According to her, this world has been created to celebrate Navel's four year anniversary and Lime's one year anniversary, and he has been invited to the world as a guest. Though he does not know what is going on, he gradually gets involved in the festival.

Characters
Each of the characters work at a restaurant, and are divided according to where they are employed. In addition to the original characters to Nee Pon? × Rai Pon!, the three Navel Girls and Lime Girls who were created as mascots of Navel and Lime, also appear in the game. Most of the girls are named after food.

Music

External links
Official website 

2007 video games
Bishōjo games
Eroge
Japan-exclusive video games
Navel (company) games
Romance video games
Single-player video games
Video games developed in Japan
Visual novels
Windows games
Windows-only games